Roger Federer defeated Marat Safin in the final, 7–6(7–3), 6–4, 6–2 to win the men's singles tennis title at the 2004 Australian Open. It was his first Australian Open title and second major title overall. With the win, Federer gained the world No. 1 ranking for the first time in his career, and would hold the position for a record 237 consecutive weeks.

Andre Agassi was the defending champion, but lost in the semifinals to Safin. This ended his streak of 26 match wins at the Australian Open.

This was the only time in Andy Roddick's career where he was seeded first at a major. He lost to Safin in the quarterfinals.

13 seeded players lost in the first round, the most at a major since the 32-seed draw was adopted at the 2001 Wimbledon Championships.

Seeds

Qualifying

Draw

Finals

Top half

Section 1

Section 2

Section 3

Section 4

Bottom half

Section 5

Section 6

Section 7

Section 8

References

External links
 Association of Tennis Professionals (ATP) – 2004 Australian Open Men's Singles draw
 2004 Australian Open – Men's draws and results at the International Tennis Federation

Mens singles
Australian Open (tennis) by year – Men's singles